The 2008 William & Mary Tribe football team represented the College of William & Mary as member of South Division of the Colonial Athletic Association (CAA) during the 2008 NCAA Division I FCS football season. Led by Jimmye Laycock in his 29th year as head coach, William & Mary finished the season with an overall record of 7–4 and a mark of 5–3 in A-10 play, placing fourth in the South Division. They were ranked No. 20 in the final Sports Network poll, but did not receive a bid to the NCAA Division I playoffs.

The 2008 season was the final one for redshirt senior cornerback and punt returner Derek Cox. Cox, an All-Conference player, was in the 2009 NFL Draft by the Jacksonville Jaguars with the ninth pick in the third round (73rd overall), making him the second-highest player ever drafted out of William & Mary. Darren Sharper was selected 60th overall in the second round of the 1997 NFL Draft.

Schedule

References

William and Mary
William & Mary Tribe football seasons
William and Mary Tribe football